3000 Whys of Blue Cat is the first large-scale Chinese animated series in mainland China with an emphasis on science.  The series is produced by "Hunan Sunchime Happy Culture Company".  The show remains one of the longest-running children's cartoon series in the world. It is most commonly referred to as "Lan Mao", or "Blue Cat".

Background
 1992: Wang Hong was inspired by "One Hundred Thousand Whys" and started creating Blue Cat in a small workshop on Xiangya Road, Changsha City, Hunan Province.
 1993: Wang Hong established Oriental Cartoon Production Co., Ltd. in Changsha City.
 1997: Wang Hong and Sun Wenhua, the chairman of Hunan Sanchen Company, established the joint venture of Sanchen Film Library. The cartoon "New 100,000 Whys" was produced.
 1998: Sanchen Film Library began to adapt this cartoon into "Naughty Blue Cat 3000 Questions". This is when the concept of the Blue Cat was officially introduced.
 June 1999: Wang Hong gave "Naughty Blue Cat 3000 Questions" to Beijing TV Station to broadcast for free, in exchange for 45 seconds of advertising time per episode. "Blue Cat" garnered a lot of attention in mainland China.
 2000: Hong Kong Asia Television purchased this animation and promoted it widely.
 August 2001: Sanchen Cartoon Group decided to take part in the industrial development of "Blue Cat" cartoon image derivative products. The industrialization of "Blue Cat" began.
 2004: Wang Hong withdrew from Sanchen Cartoon Group and established Hongmeng Cartoon Group with He Mengfan.
 December 2004: Sanchen Cartoon Group launched the "Blue Cat" game.
 January 18, 2005: Sanchen Cartoon sued Wang Hong and Hongmeng Company in the Hunan Provincial Higher People’s Court on the grounds that the defendant can not engage in the same or similar business as the plaintiff. The court ruled that henceforth Hongmeng Company may not produce or issue more Howie & Landau cartoons, with the exception of the Howie & Landau Seven Chivalrous Biography series.
 December 2006: Sanchen Cartoon Group signed an agreement with South Korea's Dongwoo Animation to translate and broadcast the cartoon to South Korea. A contract was also signed with Thailand Wisdom Education Group to translate and introduce the "Blue Cat" series of books to the local primary and secondary schools.
 November 28, 2007: The mutual shareholding of Hunan Hongmeng Cartoon and Sanchen Cartoon was formally integrated, establishing the Hunan Blue Cat Animation Media Co., Ltd.
 2009: Hunan Blue Cat Animation Media Co., Ltd. launched the "Blue Cat Dragoon" series.

Story
The color blue signifies dreams. This is why the Blue Cat is blue. The character is always curious and eager to explore different parts of the world. Blue Cat can visit any era of time through his vivid imagination.

Characters
 Super-cat Blue Cat (main character) 
 Orange fox Fei-Fei (main character) 
 Green mouse Naughty/Taoqi (main character) 
 Pink mouse Ms. Gali
 Yellow mouse Fatty/Feizai
 Mother of the kids Aunt Hen/Ji Dashen
 Red pig Sweet Sister (Tianniu)
 Strong bear Badou
 Alien girl Lala, Princess of Ozma

Series titles
 Humors Stage Series also known as Classical Blue Cat
 Star Wars Series
 Dinosaur Times Series
 Ocean World Series
 Sports Competition Series also known as Living Olympics
 Space Series also known as Adventure in Space
 Safe Driving
 The Team 119, fire protection
 Incredible Adventures of Blue Cat
 MTV of Blue Cat
 Blue Cat for Kindergarten

Totals
 424 eps for Classical Blue Cat
 384 eps for Star War
 264 eps for Dinosaur Times 312 eps for Ocean World 257 eps for Living Olympics 400 eps for Adventure in Space 108 eps for Safe Driving 119 eps for The Team 119 365 eps for Incredible Adventures of Blue Cat'''

Merchandise
Along with the cartoon programs, the franchise has produced home videos, books, CDs, kids' clothes and shoes, toys, beverage and candy.  The planning of a "Blue Cat Theme Park" has also entered the appraisal stage in 2006.  Sega have also announced a collaboration with "Sunchime Cartoon Group" and Suzhou based game software developer "XPEC Entertainment" to jointly develop and release video games or other forms of digital entertainment contents based on the Blue Cat on 4 August 2006.

References

External links 
 Official Site

1999 Chinese television series debuts
1990s Chinese television series
2000s Chinese television series
1990s animated comedy television series
Chinese children's animated comic science fiction television series
Beijing Television original programming
China Central Television original programming
Animated television series about cats
Television shows set in China
Australian Broadcasting Corporation original programming